Apostolos Papandreou (born November 10, 1975 in Athens) is a Greek sprint canoer who competed in the mid-2000s. At the 2004 Summer Olympics in Athens, he was eliminated in the semifinals of the K-1 500 m event and the heats of the K-1 1000 m event.

References
 Sports-Reference.com profile

1975 births
Canoeists at the 2004 Summer Olympics
Greek male canoeists
Living people
Olympic canoeists of Greece
Sportspeople from Athens